Los Verdaderos is the second studio album, and third overall from, Puerto Rican reggaeton duo Zion & Lennox. It was released on February 3, 2011 by
Sony Music Latin and Pina Records. Only 2 weeks of release date, the album manages to position itself as the #2 in the Urban Latin charts and #10 on Billboard
best seller in both Latin America and in the United States. The album features collaborations with Daddy Yankee, Jowell & Randy, Tony Dize, J Balvin and
Alberto Stylee. The album became a success in United States and Latin America, placing their singles #1 on both the United States and Latin America's Charts.

Track listing

Credits and personnel
Some credits adapted from AllMusic.

Félix Ortíz: Primary Artist – Vocals – Writer – Executive Producer
Gabriel Pizarro: Primary Artist – Vocals – Writer – Executive Producer
Rafael Pina: Writer – Executive Producer – Mixing
Eliel Lind: Writer – Composer – Producer – Electronic Keyboard – Guitar – Bass
Karl Palencia: Writer – Mixing – Producer
Giann Arias: Writer – Composer – Producer – Electronic Keyboard
Chris Jeday: Writer – Composer – Producer – Electronic Keyboard – Guitar
Predikador: Writer – Composer – Producer – Electronic Keyboard
José Gómez: Writer – Producer
Luis O'Neill: Writer – Composer – Producer
Esteban Piñeiro: Mastering

Joel Muñóz: Featured Artist – Vocals – Writer
Randy Ortíz: Featured Artist – Vocals – Writer
Ramón Ayala: Featured Artist – Vocals – Writer
José Osorio: Featured Artist – Vocals – Writer
Carlos Pizarro: Featured Artist – Vocals – Writer
Antonio Rivera: Featured Artist – Vocals
Gabriel Cruz: Writer
Iancarlo Reyes: Creative Art – Design
Ana Alvarado: Production Coordination
Edwin David: Photography
Andrés Coll: Marketing

References

Pina Records albums
2010 albums